Beihang University Gymnasium (sometime listed as the Beijing University of Aeronautics & Astronautics Gymnasium) is a 5,400-seat indoor arena located on the campus of Beihang University in Beijing, China. It hosted weightlifting competitions at the 2008 Summer Olympics and powerlifting competitions at the 2008 Summer Paralympics.

References
Beijing2008.cn profile

Venues of the 2008 Summer Olympics
Sports venues in Beijing
Indoor arenas in China
Olympic weightlifting venues
University sports venues in China
Sports venues completed in 2001
2001 establishments in China